Castleisland is a town and commercial centre in County Kerry in south west Ireland. The town is known for the width of its main street. As of the 2016 Census, Castleisland had a population of 2,486.

Castleisland was described by one of its citizens, journalist Con Houlihan, as "not so much a town as a street between two fields".

History

Castleisland was the centre of Desmond power in Kerry. The village got its name, 'Castle of the Island of Kerry', from a castle built in 1226 by Geoffrey Maurice (or de Marisco). Maurice had been the Lord Justice of Ireland during the reign of King Henry III. The island was created by turning the waters of the River Maine into a moat around the castle.

Sometime in the 120 years after its construction, the castle was taken by the forces of the Earl of Desmond. It is known that in 1345 the castle was being held for the Earl of Desmond by Sir Eustace de la Poer and other knights when it was captured by Sir Ralph Ufford, Lord Justice of Ireland. Sir Eustace and the other knights were captured and executed. Little is known of the further history of the castle and few ruins are left of it today. The main ruin is the de Marisco tower, located behind some private houses at the western end of the town, on the Killarney Road.

The Black and Tans and the Irish Republican Army (IRA) were active in Castleisland during the Irish War of Independence in the 1920s. On 8 May 1921, two Royal Irish Constabulary (RIC) men were shot by the IRA while leaving Castleisland Parish Church; one of the men died. Two months later, on 10 July 1921, three IRA men and four British soldiers were killed during a gunfight in the town.

Geography
Castleisland is a town in east County Kerry. It is close to the Limerick border and close to the Cork border, and the main road in western and southern Kerry passes through here. The N21 from Limerick continues on to Tralee while the N22 goes to Killarney and other towns in southern Kerry.

The Glanaruddery Mountains to the north and the Stack's Mountains to the west define the beginning of the 'Vale of Tralee', at the mouth of which Castleisland is situated.  Most of the land around Castleisland is pasture for dairy stock, with bogland located at various locations around the town, particularly to the east and south. It is in the barony of Trughanacmy.

Buildings and places of note

There are several buildings of note in Castleisland, including the Gothic-styled Church of St. Stephen and St. John which was designed by Doolin and built in 1880. The town's Carnegie Trust Library building was designed by R.M. Butler for Tralee District Council. A tender by James O'Connor, Castleisland, for £1,451.4s.7d. was accepted, subject to the approval of the architect. It was completed by 1915. The library was burnt down in 1920, and replaced by the present structure in 1929 and is located at the eastern end of Castleisland's main street. The function of the town library was moved to new premises in 2008, but the original building is still used as the district court for the area.

Crag Cave, one of the most extensive cave systems in Ireland open to the public, is located just outside Castleisland.

Transport

Rail
Castleisland railway station opened on 30 August 1875. It closed for passenger traffic on 24 February 1947 and for goods traffic on 3 November 1975, finally closing altogether on 10 January 1977.

Road
Since the 1990s traffic congestion had been an issue of concern to the people of Castleisland and its hinterland. This was because the main road linking most of County Kerry with large urban centres, such as Limerick and Dublin, passed through the centre of the town. As a result, the main street through Castleisland dealt not only with local traffic and commercial traffic for the Castleisland area, but also with traffic destined for other Kerry towns such as Tralee and Killarney. Likewise, traffic originating in other parts of Kerry was directed through the centre of Castleisland. This resulted in traffic congestion in Castleisland, and on most of its approach roads. During peak traffic times, and particularly at bank holiday weekends, delays of over half an hour were common for traffic passing through Castleisland.

It also caused inconvenience for local people over many years, and eventually, the local community decided that action was needed. In 2007 with a General election looming, a committee was formed and an organised campaign was formally started, to lobby for a bypass in Castleisland. The campaign was successful and a promise of funding for the new road was obtained from the National Roads Authority.

After over a year of planning, construction of the new road was started in May 2009 with a projected completion date of December 2010. The project involved creating two major new sections of road and one smaller section. It consists of a 3.4 km dual carriageway linking the Limerick road roundabout north of Castleisland to the Tralee road west of the town, and a 1.6 km single carriageway continuing south from the roundabout on the Tralee road to meet the Killarney road roundabout southwest of the town. At the Limerick road end, there is also a smaller section consisting of 0.4 km of single carriageway plus a climbing lane. This minor section links the newly constructed Limerick road roundabout to the pre-existing N21 Limerick road.

On 22 October 2010, the bypass was officially opened by the then Minister for Defence, Tony Killeen. This was two months ahead of the original target completion date.

Sport
Castleisland Desmonds is the local GAA club. They won the All-Ireland Senior Club Football Championship in 1985, beating St. Vincents of Dublin in the final. The club were also the winner of the 2010 series of RTÉ reality television show Celebrity Bainisteoir, while managed by singer Derek Burke of Crystal Swing.

Castleisland A.F.C. are the town's representatives in the Kerry District League in soccer.
   
Castleisland Rugby Football Club U16s was the second rugby club in Kerry, under all age groups, to win a Munster League title in 2008.

An Ríocht Athletics Club, established in 1973, is located at Crageens in Castleisland. Its facilities include a 400-metre tartan athletics track and a soccer pitch. A gym, Barracks Gym, was established in 2018 on Barrack Street in Castleisland.

St Marys is the local basketball club.

Town twinning

Castleisland became twinned with the town of Bannalec in France on 14 August 2007.

People
 Denis Mary Bradley (1846–1903), Catholic priest who became the first Bishop of Manchester, New Hampshire and co-founded Saint Anselm College.
 Mick Doyle (1941–2004), Irish rugby union international player and coach. While Doyle was coach, Ireland won the Five Nations and subsequent Triple Crown. He was born in Currow, a parish just outside Castleisland.
 Con Houlihan (1925–2012), sports journalist and columnist for the Evening Herald and Irish Press group newspapers.
 Katherine Kelly (b. 1979), British actress known for her role Coronation Street, is the daughter of John Kelly, who originally hails from Castleisland.
 Charlie Nelligan (b. 1957), Kerry GAA goalkeeper during the 1970s and 1980s who won 7 All-Ireland football medals. Nelligan played his club football with the Castleisland Desmonds, who won the All-Ireland Senior Club Football Championship in 1985.
 Redmond Prendiville (1900–1968), Archbishop of Perth; reputedly the youngest archbishop ever and aged 32 at the time of his consecration.
 Larry Sharpe (1951–2017), professional wrestler and wrestling trainer was born in Castleisland.

See also

 List of towns and villages in Ireland
 Market Houses in Ireland

References

Towns and villages in County Kerry